Roger Wood Wilkins (January 29, 1932 – March 26, 2017) was an American lawyer, civil rights leader, professor of history, and journalist who served as the 15th United States Assistant Attorney General under President Lyndon B. Johnson from 1966 to 1969.

A member of the Democratic party, Wilkins was mentored by Associate Justice of the Supreme Court Thurgood Marshall early in his career. Throughout the 1960's, Wilkins campaigned for the passage of the Civil Rights Act of 1964 and the Voting Rights Act of 1965. In 1965, President Lyndon B. Johnson appointed Wilkins to be the administration's chief troubleshooter on urban racial issues, and later became assistant attorney general under the Johnson administration.

Wilkins' uncle, Roy Wilkins, was the former executive director of the National Association for the Advancement of Colored People (NAACP) from 1964 to 1977.

Biography
Wilkins was born in Kansas City, Missouri, on January 29, 1932, and grew up in Michigan. He was educated at Crispus Attucks Elementary School in Kansas City, Missouri, then Creston High School in Grand Rapids, Michigan.  Wilkins received his A.B. degree in 1953 and J.D. degree in 1956, both from the University of Michigan, where he interned with the NAACP and was a member of the senior leadership society, Michigamua.

Career
Wilkins worked as a welfare lawyer in Ohio before becoming an Assistant Attorney General in President Lyndon B. Johnson's administration at age 33, one of the highest-ranking Black Americans ever to serve in the executive branch up to that time.

Roger Wilkins was sworn in as Director of the federal Community Relations Service on Friday, February 4, 1966, in a ceremony at The White House.

Leaving government in 1969 at the end of the Johnson administration, he worked briefly for the Ford Foundation before joining the editorial staff of The Washington Post.

Along with Carl Bernstein, Herbert Block ("Herblock"), and Bob Woodward, Wilkins earned a Pulitzer Prize in 1973 for exposing the Watergate scandal that eventually forced President Richard Nixon's resignation from office. He left the Post in 1974 to work for The New York Times, followed five years later by a brief stay at the now-defunct Washington Star. In 1980, he became a radio news commentator, working for National Public Radio (NPR).

Wilkins was the Robinson Professor of History and American Culture at George Mason University in Fairfax, Virginia until his retirement in 2007.  During his tenure at George Mason, Wilkins was, arguably, one of the most preeminent professors in residence at that time.  Wilkins was also the publisher of the NAACP's journal, The Crisis, and was the nephew of Roy Wilkins, a past executive director of the NAACP.

Wilkins resided in Washington, D.C., and was married to Patricia King, Professor of Law at Georgetown University.

Wilkins died on March 26, 2017, in Kensington, Maryland from complications of dementia. He was 85.

Bibliography
 A Man's Life: An Autobiography. 1982, reprinted 1991. New York: Simon & Schuster. .
 Quiet Riots: Race and Poverty in the United States. Edited by Wilkins and Fred Harris. 1998. New York: Pantheon Books. .
 Jefferson's Pillow: The Founding Fathers and the Dilemma of Black Patriotism. 2001. Boston: Beacon Press. .

References

External links

Booknotes interview with Wilkins on Jefferson's Pillow: The Founding Fathers and the Dilemma of Black Patriotism, August 12, 2001.
Tell Me More interview aired Feb 17, 2011
Roger Wilkins Papers at George Mason University
1989 Roger Wilkins interview on racism in the U.S. 

1932 births
2017 deaths
Ohio lawyers
African-American historians
20th-century American historians
American male non-fiction writers
Historians of the United States
American newspaper reporters and correspondents
American broadcast news analysts
American radio journalists
United States Assistant Attorneys General
African-American memoirists
Lyndon B. Johnson administration personnel
University of Michigan alumni
University of Michigan Law School alumni
George Mason University faculty
Pulitzer Prize winners
American memoirists
Journalists from Missouri
Journalists from Michigan
Historians from Missouri
Historians from Michigan
Activists for African-American civil rights
20th-century American lawyers
American autobiographers
African-American lawyers
American male biographers
20th-century American male writers
21st-century American historians
21st-century American male writers
Writers from Kansas City, Missouri